Neustadtl an der Donau is a town in the district of Amstetten in Lower Austria in Austria.

Geography
Neustadtl an der Donau lies in the Mostviertel in Lower Austria on the Danube. About 41 percent of the municipality is forested.

References

Cities and towns in Amstetten District
Populated places on the Danube